Kayupovo (Qäyüp) is a rural locality (a village) in Belyankovsky Selsoviet, Belokataysky District, Bashkortostan, Russia. The population was 122 as of 2010. There is 1 street.

Geography 
Kayupovo is located 50 km north of Novobelokatay (the district's administrative centre) by road. Kirikeyevo is the nearest rural locality.

References 

Rural localities in Belokataysky District